Hammer Bay is a 2007 Australian TV film written and directed by Ben Briand. The film's unconventional structure is part narrative and part fabricated documentary. The ensemble cast includes Jacki Weaver, Guy Edmonds, Ben Briand, Jessica McNamee, Sam Smith, David Michôd and Amy Mizzi.

Plot
When a documentary crew arrive one morning asking questions about the recent violent beachside murder of Amanda Blakely, teen beauty and drama pet, a captivating study into the minds and psyche of the sleepy town unfolds. The lines between the observant film crew, interview participants and police begin to blur, as family members, friends and strangers all start to demonstrate one common thread, everyone is hiding something.

History
After submitting a largely improvised 3 min test pilot for the inaugural Optus ONE80PROJECT competition, it was awarded the People's Choice Award on 28 January 2007. In a joint venture with MTV Australia, Sony Ericsson and Optus, the festival was the first round of the initiative designed to expose the talent of standout new directors, writers and producers. Judges for the competition that year were Abbie Cornish, Neil Armfield, Alice Bell, Nash Edgerton and Joel Edgerton.

The 1 hour film was produced through MTV and Cherub Pictures.

External links

 Hammer Bay Trailer
 Ben Briand web site
 ONE80PROJECT web site

2007 films
2007 short films
Australian drama short films
2000s English-language films
2000s Australian films
Australian drama television films